Kristiina Hannele Mäki (born 22 September 1991) is a Finnish-born runner who represents the Czech Republic in international competitions.

Background
Mäki was born in Seinäjoki, Finland and moved to the Czech Republic with her parents at the age of three. Her father is Finnish and mother from the Czech Republic, both former runners.

Running career
In February 2014 Mäki ran the fastest Finnish indoor time of 21st century with 9.02,14 and also won gold medals from 2014 Finnish indoor championships from both 1500 and 3000 meters. She now represents solely the Czech Republic.

In June 2014 Mäki broke the 14-year-old record set by Marjo Venäläinen in the rarely run 2000 meters and was also the first Finnish woman to break the 6-minute barrier. The new record is 5.42,71. In the same month she broke the qualifying limit for Zurich European Championship on 5000 meters; the 15.35,82 result was the best Finnish time of the 21st century and fourth of all time in Finland. In August 2014 Mäki won silver in 1500m at the Finnish outdoor championships.

Mäki is the current Czech record holder at 2000m, 3000m and 5000m. She has also claimed gold medals from Czech championships in the 5000m (2013), 1500m indoors (2013 and 2014) and 3000m indoors (2013).

References

1991 births
Living people
Czech female long-distance runners
Finnish emigrants to the Czech Republic
Naturalized citizens of the Czech Republic
Finnish female long-distance runners
Finnish people of Czech descent
Czech people of Finnish descent
Universiade medalists in athletics (track and field)
Universiade gold medalists for the Czech Republic
People from Seinäjoki
Czech Athletics Championships winners
Medalists at the 2015 Summer Universiade
Medalists at the 2017 Summer Universiade
Athletes (track and field) at the 2020 Summer Olympics
Olympic athletes of the Czech Republic
Sportspeople from South Ostrobothnia